Joe F. Smith (December 25, 1918 – August 2, 2013) was an American politician.

Born in Bristol, Virginia, he served in the United States Army during World War II. He graduated from Virginia Polytechnic Institute in 1941. After World War II, he worked for C&P Telephone and moved to Charleston, West Virginia. In 1967, he served on the Charleston City Council and then in 1975, Smith was elected city treasurer. In 1980 he was selected mayor of Charleston serving until 1983. In 1985, Governor Jay Rockefeller appointed Smith executive secretary of the West Virginia Public Employees System. He then served in the West Virginia House of Delegates from 1993-1994 and 1997-2002 as a Democrat. He died in Charleston, West Virginia.

See also
 List of mayors of Charleston, West Virginia

Notes

1918 births
2013 deaths
People from Bristol, Virginia
Virginia Tech alumni
West Virginia city council members
Mayors of Charleston, West Virginia
Democratic Party members of the West Virginia House of Delegates
United States Army personnel of World War II
Military personnel from West Virginia
City and town treasurers in the United States